Mara Santangelo was the defending champion, however she chose not to compete this year.

Petra Martić won her maiden $100,000 title, defeating Sharon Fichman in the final, 7–5, 6–4.

Seeds

Draw

Finals

Top half

Bottom half

References 
Main Draw
Qualifying Draw

Torneo Internazionale Regione Piemonte - Singles
Torneo Internazionale Regione Piemonte